The Home Town Girl is a 1919 American silent comedy film directed by Robert G. Vignola, written by Oscar Graeve and Edith Kennedy, and starring Vivian Martin, Ralph Graves, Lee Phelps, Carmen Phillips, Stanhope Wheatcroft, and Herbert Standing. It was released on May 11, 1919, by Paramount Pictures.

Plot

Nell Fanshawe (Martin) has so many suitors that she does not know what to do, and against her parents’ wishes she looks with favor upon John Stanley (Graves), who works in the village drug store. John becomes ambitious and goes to New York City to seek his fortune. He sells some valuable rugs to a wealthy lady and is persuaded by a discharged clerk to try his hand at cards. After he loses all of the firm's money in a poker game, he runs away. Nell goes to the city, obtains work in the same firm, and after she eventually finds John gets his position restored so in the end they find happiness.

Cast
Vivian Martin as Nell Fanshawe
Ralph Graves as John Stanley
Lee Phelps as Frank Willis
Carmen Phillips as Nan Powderly
Stanhope Wheatcroft as Steve Ratling
Herbert Standing as Peter Jellaby
Pietro Sosso as Mr. Fanshawe
Edythe Chapman as Mrs. Fanshawe
William Courtright as Ryder Brother
Tom Bates as Ryder Brother
Thomas Persse as Manager

References

External links 

 

1919 films
1910s English-language films
Silent American comedy films
1919 comedy films
Paramount Pictures films
Films directed by Robert G. Vignola
American black-and-white films
American silent feature films
1910s American films